Mr. Mackey Jr. is a fictional character in the adult animated television series South Park. He is voiced by series co-creator Trey Parker and debuted in the season one episode "Mr. Hankey, the Christmas Poo". The guidance counselor at South Park Elementary is best known for saying "m'kay" at the end (or beginning) of most of his sentences. 

Mr. Mackey is based on Parker's junior high school counselor Stan Lackey.

Appearance
Mackey has a disproportionately large head, which is caused by the tightness of his tie. He wears a green long-sleeved shirt, a blue tie, dark blue pants, and blue leather shoes, as well as black-rimmed glasses. He speaks with a Southern accent. Mackey has black yet thinning hair.

Character biography
Mackey is the school counselor at South Park Elementary. Despite that, he occasionally teaches classes at school. He taught sex education with Ms. Choksondik, with whom he had a sexual relationship until her death. Following this, he took over the fourth-grade class until Mr. Garrison returned. In "Ike's Wee Wee", Mackey taught Mr. Garrison's class about drugs and alcohol. But after he passed marijuana to the students, and realized it was stolen (by who he thought was one of the students, but was actually revealed to be Mr. Garrison), he gets fired for this, and eventually gets evicted by his landlord, which culminated in him falling into a depression, and taking drugs himself as well.

It was presumed that in "Proper Condom Use", the last time Mackey had sex was 21 years ago (when he mentions he was 19). In the episodes "Something You Can Do with Your Finger" and "Cat Orgy" it was hinted there were bondage sex scenes with Liane Cartman, where in the former episode, Eric Cartman watches a tape of Mackey and Liane, where the latter is Mackey's sex slave, and drinks from a cup of her own urine, while the latter episode shows Mackey flirting with Liane.

In "Insheeption" it was revealed that Mackey is a hoarder because of his troubled childhood when he was a fourth-grader in 1974. He was shown to be bullied by other children and was a fan of Woodsy Owl, but at the end of a field trip, the owl molested him. Later in the episode, he threatened to rape Stan Marsh in the mouth if the latter throws anything in Mackey's hoarded office away.

Mackey was shown in "Trapped in the Closet" in the Church of Scientology Org, though it isn't known that from that episode continues having sessions with the Org. He is fluent in Spanish revealed in "Rainforest Shmainforest".

Unlike many of the major adult characters, his first name is currently unknown.

References

South Park characters
Animated human characters
Fictional characters from Colorado
Fictional psychologists
Fictional Republicans (United States)
Fictional school counselors
Television characters introduced in 1997
Animated characters introduced in 1997